The Ludwig Boltzmann Prize is awarded by the Austrian Physical Society and honors outstanding achievements in theoretical physics. It is named after the famous Austrian physicist Ludwig Boltzmann. 

The prize was established at the annual meeting of the Austrian Physical Society in Innsbruck in 1953. It is awarded every other year, alternating with the Fritz Kohlrausch Prize for experimental physics, to an outstanding theoretical physicist who is usually not older than 35 years. Currently (2011) the prize money is 2500 Euro.

Awardees 
Source: Austrian Physical Society

See also 
 Awards and Prizes of the Austrian Physical Society (in german)
 List of physics awards
 List of prizes named after people

References

Physics awards
Austrian awards
Prize
Awards established in 1953